Willisham is a small village in the suburbs of the county town of Ipswich, Suffolk. The small parish village has been present since the 11th century and was included in the Domesday Book. During the 18th century the village was once home to wheat and barley farmers. During the 20th century the village has gained new homes with the local authority building at Fiske Pightle, and private dwellings in the cul-de-sac of North Acres being built in 1965/1966. In the year 2000 the village had 9 new houses built down Tye Lane. The village post office was renovated into a house 8 years ago.
The 2011 census recorded a population of 362 people.

During the 1870s Willisham was described as:
"a parish in Bosmere district, Suffolk; 3 miles W of Claydon r. station, and 7 NW of Ipswich."

History 

The earliest records of Willisham date back to 1066 when it was known as Willaluesham. It was recorded in the Domesday Book as part of the hundred of Bosmere and had a value of £4.6 to the lord. At this time the village consisted of 20 households which is counted by the heads of family, meaning that the actual population is likely to be 5 times higher.
The origin of the name Willisham is stated on the parish council website as being:
"derived from Wiglaf Meadow or Enclosure. The name Wiglaf occurs in Beowulf."
As well as being called Willaluesham, in the past, it has also been known as Wylavesham, Willavesham and Wylewesham. During 1884 the area underwent boundary changes moving certain areas of Somersham, Offton and Nettlestead. However Willisham did gain some of Offton.

Geography 
Willisham is located 11.4 km north west of Ipswich, 8.1 km south of Stowmarket and 104.4 km away from London.

Rivers 
To the east of Willisham lies the River Gipping which enabled travel further up into Suffolk notably by the Danes in the year 860. To the west of Willisham lies the River Brett which later goes on to join the River Stour.

Demography

Religion 

According to the 2011 census, 65.7% of the population is Christian with the second largest group being of no religion at 28.5% of the total population. 4.7% of the population did not declare their religious beliefs, 0.3% of the population is Buddhist and 0.8%  are categorised as other.

Ethnic Groups 

The 2011 census data shows that Willisham is predominantly a White British area of residence with 96.1% of the population describing themselves as this. The rest of the population is made up of much smaller ethnic groups which are; Other White at 2.2%, White and Asian at 0.8%, Asian British at 0.3%, White Irish at 0.3% and Other Mixed at 0.3%.

Economy 
The 1881 census recorded 34.7% of the population working within the agricultural sector and 43.2% of the population are recorded as being in an unknown occupation. 6.3% worked and dealt with houses and furniture, 5.3% worked with general or unspecified commodities and 4.2% worked in unspecified occupations.  
The 2011 census showed the largest occupational group within Willisham to be managerial roles with 18% of the economically active population belonging to this category. Professional occupations is the second largest group within Willisham constituting 15% of the economically active population. The lowest occupational group within Willisham is the sales and customer service occupation with only 7% being part of this sector.

Landmarks

Tye Farmhouse 
Tye Farmhouse is a grade II listed building situated at the bottom of Tye Lane. Dating back to the mid 16th century it contains alterations from the mid 20th century. It has been a listed building since 24 January 1986.

Long Meadow 
Long Meadow is a grade II listed building located on Holly Road. Dating back to the early 16th century it has undergone modifications during the early 17th and mid 20th centuries. It has been a listed building since 24 January 1986.

Transport

Major Roads 
The nearest major road to Willisham is the A14 which starts at the Port of Felixstowe and continues to the Catthorpe Interchange.

Airports 
The closest airport to Willisham is Norwich International Airport which is 44.9 miles away, this airport runs flights to domestic as well as international destinations. The next nearest airport is Cambridge Airport which is 49.7 miles away. Willisham is also very close to Wattisham Airfield which is operated by the British Army after being closed by the RAF as an airforce base in 1993.

Ports 
The Port of Felixstowe is the nearest port to Willisham and is the UK's busiest container port. Willisham is also close to Harwich International Port which mainly provides ferry services.

Religious Sites

St.Mary's Church 
Located on top of Strawberry Hill, the present day building was constructed in 1878 on the site of the previous church, the remnants of which were in part used to construct the outer layer of the current church. The Domesday book records a church being present in Willisham which would suggest that some form of Christian worship has been present in this area since at least the 11th century.

References

Parish Magazine is the Link Newsletter
Parish Magazine on line

Sources 
Willisham at Picturesofengland.com

Civil parishes in Suffolk
Mid Suffolk District
Villages in Suffolk